is a town located in Okhotsk Subprefecture, Hokkaido, Japan.

As of September 2016, the town has an estimated population of 3,963 and a population density of 11 persons per km2. The total area is 362.41 km2. It is 137 miles from the New Chitose Airport.

Climate

References

External links

Official Website 

Towns in Hokkaido